The 2012 KW Fall Classic was held from September 20 to 23 at the Kitchener-Waterloo Granite Curling Club in Waterloo, Ontario as part of the 2012–13 Ontario Curling Tour. The men's event was held in a triple knockout format, and the women's event was in a round robin format. The purse for the men's event was CAD$8,500, and the purse for the women's event was CAD$15,000.

Men

Teams

Knockout results

A event

B event

C event

Playoffs

Women

Teams

Round Robin Standings

Playoffs

External links

KW Fall Classic
2012 in Ontario
Sport in Waterloo, Ontario
Curling in Ontario